The Nightmare Fair is a story originally written for the 1986 season of Doctor Who, but never filmed.  A novelisation based on the script was published in 1989 by Target Books, as the first volume of its Missing Episodes series.  The script and novelisation were written by former series producer Graham Williams, and would have been directed by Matthew Robinson had it gone to air.  It is the first novel-length text featuring The Doctor not to be based upon a previously transmitted production, although being a novelisation it is not strictly speaking an "original" novel.

An audio play closely based on Williams' script was released in May 2003, with profits going to the charity Sense. For this adaptation, the Sixth Doctor was played by Steve Hill, and Peri by Jennifer Adams Kelley.

A second audio adaption, done by Big Finish, was released in 2009. Adapted by John Ainsworth, it featured both Colin Baker and Nicola Bryant reprising their television roles of the Sixth Doctor and Peri respectively.

Synopsis
The TARDIS falls through a time well, landing in modern-day Blackpool at an amusement fair. The Doctor and Peri, finding nothing else amiss, start to enjoy the fair's attractions. They are separated on an amusement ride; the Doctor's car is directed into the depths of the fair, while Peri encounters Kevin, a teenaged-boy looking for his brother who is missing but had last been seen at the fair weeks ago. The two are also eventually captured and brought to a prison where the Doctor has also been caged.

They discover their captor is the Celestial Toymaker, who has been stuck on Earth for several millennia, tricking a few unsuspecting humans into playing games with him and losing, become his perpetual servants. The Toymaker created the time well to bring the Doctor here, and added elements to the fair to help capture the Doctor. The Toymaker is on the verge of completing his "great work": an arcade game that feeds on the souls that lose to it, which then can generate powerful creatures with which the Toymaker plans to take over Earth.  He is prepared to have the game mass-produced in America to complete his plan. The Doctor, who knows that the Time Lords do not fully know who or what the Toymaker is, learns that he is a powerful psychic being from another dimension where time moves much slower, giving him his seemingly immortality. Knowing that he cannot hurt the Toymaker physically, he works with Peri, Kevin, a Venusian engineer and a human android who is also one of the Toymaker's captives, to construct a device to disrupt the Toymaker's psychic field. The Doctor then traps him in a time field of his device that prevents the Toymaker from being able to control anyone outside of it and that will last forever. The other creatures captured by the Toymaker are freed, including Kevin's brother. The Doctor decides to return with Peri back to enjoy the fair a bit more.

Background
Several stories were in the planning stages for the 23rd Season of Doctor Who, three of which were in the middle of being scripted when the (temporary) cancellation announcement was made. Former series Producer Graham Williams was to have written the season opener, featuring a return of the Celestial Toymaker as seen in the 1966 serial. Being the first slated for production, Williams script was by far the most advanced at the time of cancellation, with Matthew Robinson (who had helmed Resurrection of the Daleks and Attack of the Cybermen in the previous two seasons) pencilled in as director.

Intended production
Studio days were booked for this story to be recorded, starting on 20 May 1985. Location filming was also planned to take place in Blackpool at the Pleasure Beach, on the promenade and at south shore police station.  The story however was never produced due to Doctor Who first being cancelled by the BBC, then this being revised to an 18-month break, with all planned storylines being junked and a new, shorter season being assembled for transmission in September 1986.

Intended transmission 
Prior to the hiatus that was announced in February 1985, The Nightmare Fair Part One was to have been transmitted on 4 January 1986. Part Two was to have been broadcast on 11 January 1986.

Novelisation
In 1988, Target Books, which had been successfully publishing novelisations of Doctor Who stories for many years, saw itself running out of available televised materiala.  Although a number of serials remained unadapted, most were off-limits due to licensing problems. While negotiations went forward with the BBC for the publication of new adventures, three of the cancelled scripts were published in book form. The writers of all three were approached, and all were signed to write the novels. The Nightmare Fair required far less additional material than the other two, and in May 1989 it became the first to be published under the Missing Episodes banner. It was the first of 275 releases from different publishers as of 2007 that were not televised or broadcast on radio (the novelisation of the radio story Slipback had been published in 1986).

The next two books in the series were The Ultimate Evil by Wally K. Daly, released in August 1989, and Mission to Magnus by Philip Martin, published in July 1990 (the first Doctor Who novel based on non-televised material to be published after the end of the original series).

Notes
The original ending of the 1985 series finale, Revelation of the Daleks, had the Doctor telling Peri he was going to take her to Blackpool. Before broadcast, however, the decision was made to freeze frame the Doctor before he says this. Williams' novelisation of the serial does not, therefore, take its lead from the original ending of Revelation.  At the start of this novel TARDIS is drawn into "the nexus of the primeval cauldron of Space-Time itself" and he and Peri are surprised to find themselves in Blackpool.
The Past Doctor Adventures novel Divided Loyalties ends with the Toymaker telling his companion Stefan "I'll take you to Blackpool", both setting up this story and pastiching the original end of Revelation.
In the text of the novel, the character Kevin is given the surname Stoney. Kevin Stoney is the name of an actor who appeared in earlier stories in the televised series.

Audio adaption

Big Finish Productions produced an audio drama adaptation of The Nightmare Fair in 2009. In early March 2009, Big Finish announced that the role of the Toymaker was to be played by David Bailie, who had previously played Dask in the 1977 story The Robots of Death.  The original 1966 Toymaker story starred Michael Gough, but at the time of audio recording, he had retired from acting.

Cast
The Doctor – Colin Baker
Peri – Nicola Bryant
Celestial Toymaker – David Bailie
Kevin – Matthew Noble
Stefan – Andrew Fettes
Woman – Louise Faulkner
Shardow/Attendant – William Whymper
Yatsumoto/Truscott/Manager/Man – Toby Longworth
Humandroid/Security Man/Geoff/Guard – Duncan Wisbey

Continuity
Seven months before this audio was released, Big Finish brought back the Celestial Toymaker in The Magic Mousetrap.
In this story, the Doctor marked a reference to City of Death character, Duggan.

Production notes
Doctor who's Audio Series producer David Richardson briefed all the Composers including Jamie Robertson to give the lost stories season an original but classic "80's Retro" feel.

Jamie used Various Synths for the music soundtrack and sound design including an AKAI AX-80 and a Yamaha SY85.

References

External links
Big Finish Productions – The Nightmare Fair
Hidden Planet Lost Scripts site
The Cloister Library – The Nightmare Fair

1989 British novels
1989 science fiction novels
Sixth Doctor novels
Sixth Doctor audio plays
Novels set in Lancashire
Unproduced television episodes